Computer Corporation of America (CCA) was a computer software and database systems company founded in 1965. It was best known for its Model 204 (M204) database system for IBM and compatible mainframes.

It was acquired by Rocket Software in 2010.

Corporate history
Founded in 1965, Computer Corporation of America (CCA) was a computer software and database systems. with offices in Technology Square, Kendall Square, Cambridge, Massachusetts.

Their primary database product, first deployed in 1972, was Model 204 (M204), which ran on IBM mainframes. It incorporates a programming language and an environment for application development.

CCA operated the ARPANET Datacomputer.

In 1992, CCA purchased the System 1022 and System 1032 assets of Software House; these database systems were designed for Digital Equipment Corporation's PDP-10 and VAX systems, respectively.

In 1984, CCA was purchased by Crowntek, a Toronto-based company. Crowntek sold Computer Corporation of America's Advanced Information Technology division to Xerox Corporation in 1988.

The balance of CCA was acquired by Rocket Software, a Boston-based developer of enterprise infrastructure products, in April 2010.

CCA EMACS
Early Ads for ''CCA EMACS (Computer Corporation of America) (Steve Zimmerman) appeared in 1984. 1985 comparisons to GNU Emacs, when it came out, mentioned free vs. $2,400.

References

2010 mergers and acquisitions
American companies established in 1965
American companies disestablished in 2010
Companies based in Cambridge, Massachusetts
Software companies established in 1965
Software companies disestablished in 2010